Sidney Adam Rivera (born November 15, 1993) is a professional soccer player who plays for USL League Two side Morris Elite SC. Born in the United States, he represents Puerto Rico internationally.

Born and raised in Staten Island, New York, Rivera moved to Hampton, New Jersey and played high school soccer at Saint Benedict's Preparatory School and North Hunterdon High School.

Career

College
Rivera spent his entire college career at Old Dominion University.  He made a total of 48 appearances for the Monarchs and tallied 11 goals and one assist.  He led the team with nine goals in 2014, where he won the first ever Conference-USA tournament championship in Old Dominion University history while being named tournament offensive MVP. Rivera played for Virginia Beach City FC in the summer of 2014.

Professional
On January 20, 2015, Rivera was selected in the third round (63rd overall) of the 2015 MLS SuperDraft by Orlando City. While he earned a contract with Orlando, the team loaned him out on May 8 to USL affiliate club Louisville City FC.  He made his professional debut four days later in a 3–0 victory over the Wilmington Hammerheads. Rivera went on to make 10 appearances for Louisville before leaving the team under circumstances that neither Louisville, nor Orlando would comment on. On July 30, he was sent on loan to the Pittsburgh Riverhounds along with teammate, Conor Donovan, in a bid to gain more experience. However, Rivera would only make 1 appearance for the Riverhounds and he was released by Orlando on November 25, 2015.

On April 6, 2016, Rivera signed with NASL expansion side Puerto Rico FC. In his first season with the club, Rivera found consistent playing time for the first time in his professional career, making 16 appearances and scoring 3 goals. After a successful first season with the club, Rivera appeared in 20 matches for Puerto Rico FC, however, he only started 6 matches and his minutes over the course of the season decreased. Due to the hiatus by both the NASL, due to operations reasons, and the team, because of the devastation caused by Hurricane Maria, Rivera left the club at the end of the 2017 season.

After leaving Puerto Rico, Rivera had a brief stint in the semi-professional National Premier Soccer League, making 7 appearances for Atlantic City FC. Then he had a brief stint with USL Championship side, Reno 1868, where he failed to make an appearance for the club. After leaving Reno, Rivera moved to V.League 1 side Than Quang Ninh. However, despite playing and starting in the first two matches for the club, Rivera was dropped from the squad for undisclosed reasons. After leaving Vietnam, Rivera returned to New Jersey where he began playing for FC Motown in the National Premier Soccer League.

After the NPSL season, Rivera signed with the Philadelphia Fury of the National Independent Soccer Association, along with several of his FC Motown teammates, ahead of the league's inaugural season.

On April 26, 2021, Rivera signed with USL League Two side Morris Elite SC to compete in the clubs inaugural season. On May 24, 2021, he scored the first goal for the club in a 1-0 victory over F.A. Euro, the first victory in club history.

International
Rivera was born in the United States to a Colombian father and Cape Verdean mother. After a stint with Puerto Rico FC, he gained the option to represent the Puerto Rico national football team. He made his debut for Puerto Rico on 24 March 2019 in a CONCACAF Nations League qualifier against Grenada, as a 58th-minute substitute for Héctor Ramos.

International goals
Scores and results Puerto Rico's goal tally first.

References

External links
 

uslleaguetwo.com

1993 births
Living people
Puerto Rican footballers
Puerto Rico international footballers
American soccer players
American sportspeople of Colombian descent
American people of Cape Verdean descent
African-American soccer players
Old Dominion Monarchs men's soccer players
Orlando City SC players
Louisville City FC players
Pittsburgh Riverhounds SC players
Puerto Rico FC players
Reno 1868 FC players
Association football forwards
People from Hampton, New Jersey
Soccer players from New Jersey
Sportspeople from Hunterdon County, New Jersey
Orlando City SC draft picks
USL Championship players
North American Soccer League players
North Hunterdon High School alumni
FC Motown players
National Independent Soccer Association players
Philadelphia Fury players
American expatriate soccer players
American expatriate sportspeople in Vietnam
American expatriates in Bangladesh
Expatriate footballers in Vietnam
Expatriate footballers in Bangladesh
Bangladesh Police FC players
Morris Elite SC players
21st-century African-American sportspeople